Janet Montgomery Jardine Auld (1921 – 16 February 2017), known as Jenny Auld, was a Scottish politician.

Born in Glasgow, Jenny was the daughter of Mary Auld, a prominent figure in the Scottish Labour Party.  She attended Hutchesons' Girls' Grammar School, then studied at the University of Glasgow.  She served in the Auxiliary Territorial Service during World War II, soon rising to become a sergeant.

Auld stood for Labour in Ayr at the 1951 UK general election, taking second place, with 15,702 votes.  She later trained as a teacher, working at Duncanrig Secondary from 1957, and moving to East Kilbride.  She campaigned for the settlement to be made a large burgh, which was achieved in 1962.  It was granted a town council, to which Auld was elected, becoming its first Senior Bailie.  From 1966 to 1972, she served on the town's development corporation, and in 1993 she became the only woman to be made a freeman of the town.  She also served a term as chair of the Scottish Labour Party.

References

1921 births
2017 deaths
Alumni of the University of Glasgow
Politicians from Glasgow
Scottish Labour councillors
Scottish Labour parliamentary candidates
Auxiliary Territorial Service soldiers
Women councillors in Scotland